Puerto Rico Highway 140 (PR-140) is a road that travels from Jayuya, Puerto Rico to Barceloneta, passing through Utuado, Ciales and Florida. This highway begins at PR-143 in Pica barrio and ends at PR-2 in Florida Afuera barrio.

Major intersections

See also

 List of highways numbered 140

References

External links
 

140